The McBurney House is the oldest surviving house in Steuben County, New York. It is located at 5872 Dineen Road (formerly New York Route 36), between the village of Canisteo and the city of Hornell, in the town of Hornellsville, New York. It is served by the Canisteo post office.

A marker at the site reads:

This tunnel is said to be where the slaves made their way from the river to the house. The tunnel was no longer usable but she could still see into it."

References

Houses in Steuben County, New York
Houses on the Underground Railroad
1797 establishments in New York (state)
Canisteo, New York